The South African Railways Class MC1 2-6-6-0 of 1914 was a steam locomotive.

In 1914 the South African Railways placed fifteen  Class MC1 Mallet articulated compound steam locomotives with a 2-6-6-0 wheel arrangement in service.

Manufacturer
Orders for an improved version of the Class MC were placed with the North British Locomotive Company in 1913. When the fifteen locomotives were delivered and placed in service in May 1914, they were designated Class MC1 and numbered in the range from 1634 to 1648.

Characteristics
The Class MC1 were duplicates of the Class MC in most respects, to the extent that the majority of spare parts for the two classes were interchangeable. Improvements consisted mainly of  larger diameter high-pressure and low-pressure cylinders and a redesigned boiler which included a superheater instead of the saturated steam boiler of the Class MC. The high-pressure cylinders of the hind engine unit were equipped with piston valves while the low-pressure cylinders of the front engine unit were equipped with slide valves.

An externally obvious difference was the main steam pipes from the dome to the high-pressure cylinders, which was no longer arranged vertically down directly to the cylinders along the outside of the boiler, but internally via the superheater in the smokebox and from there along the underside of the running boards back to the cylinders. The result was a much better performing locomotive with an increased tractive effort brought about by the larger cylinders.

The same tender was used by altogether sixteen locomotive classes, but those of the Class MC1 were fitted with a radial type of drawgear.

Modifications
Unlike all other locomotive types where the SAR reported tractive effort at 75% of boiler pressure, it followed an ultra-conservative practice of reporting that of all Mallet locomotives at 50%.

Service
The Class MC1 was placed in service on the coal line from Witbank to Germiston. In later years, some also saw service on the Natal mainline and the Cape Midland System. A number of them were transferred to the Cape Western System where they served as banking engines up the Hex River Railpass between De Doorns and Touws River.

The locomotives were all finally withdrawn from service and scrapped during 1937.

Illustration
The main picture shows driver Kok with his locomotive, c. 1930, while the following serve to illustrate both sides of the locomotive as well as the lined livery which was in use on the SAR when the locomotives were introduced.

References

2230
2-6-6-0 locomotives
(1C)C locomotives
NBL locomotives
Cape gauge railway locomotives
Railway locomotives introduced in 1914
1914 in South Africa
Scrapped locomotives